Cleve A. Hall (June 22, 1959 – March 31, 2021) was an American special effects artist, make-up artist, and actor who starred on the Syfy reality television series Monster Man.

Career
Although digital special effects became more popular in the 1990s, Hall continued using physical based effects and received an Emmy nomination for his work on Yo Gabba Gabba!. He also created props for bands such as KISS (for whom he created Gene Simmons' chest armor), Insane Clown Posse, and Alice Cooper.

As an actor, Hall appeared in numerous films beginning in the mid-1980s, most often portraying psychotic killers. In the 2012 film Black Dahlia Haunting, Hall played the killer of Elizabeth Short and won Best Killer Award for his performance at the 2013 Shockfest Film Festival. He also played keyboards in punk and death rock bands, such as Mad Love while living in Florida, and Exquisite Corpse in Los Angeles in the 1980s. He played keyboards with the gothic/Celtic/metal band Urn. 

Hall starred in the Syfy reality television series Monster Man, working with Sota F/X.

Personal life
Hall had two daughters; Constance and Elora. Constance and Elora were part of his special effects team, and they co-starred on his reality show Monster Man, along with his ex-wife, Sonia Hall. 

Hall resided in Los Angeles with his family.

Selected filmography

References

External links 
 Monster Man at SyFy Channel
 

Special effects people
American make-up artists
1959 births
2021 deaths
Place of birth missing
Artists from Florida
Artists from Los Angeles
Place of death missing